Aidan Fulton (born 1 January 1994 in Greenock) is a Scottish footballer who last played for Greenock Morton in the Scottish Championship.

Career

Fulton made his senior debut at the age of 19, as a substitute against Dunfermline Athletic on 13 April 2013. Fulton officially left Morton in September 2014.

References

External links

See also
Greenock Morton F.C. season 2012-13 | 2013–14

1994 births
Living people
Scottish footballers
Footballers from Greenock
Association football midfielders
Greenock Morton F.C. players
Scottish Football League players
Scottish Professional Football League players
Celtic F.C. players
St Mirren F.C. players